Antônio do Carmo Cheuiche O.C.D. (June 13, 1927 in Caçapava do Sul – October 14, 2009 in Ivoti) was the Brazilian Auxiliary Bishop of Santa Maria (1969–1971) and Porto Alegre (1971–2001).

References
Antônio do Carmo Cheuiche at Catholic-hierarchy.org

1927 births
2009 deaths
Pontifical Catholic University of Rio Grande do Sul alumni
20th-century Roman Catholic bishops in Brazil
Discalced Carmelite bishops
Roman Catholic bishops of Santa Maria